The Battle of Rathangan is the name given to a military engagement between the forces of the British Crown and the United Irishmen during the 1798 rebellion.

On 24 May 1798 a group of rebels from the United Irishmen led by a Captain Doorley attacked the town of Rathangan, County Kildare which was being defended by a small corps of yeomanry led by Captain James Spencer; the rebels held the town for four days. However, on 28 May 1798 two squadrons of the 7th Dragoon Guards were sent to re-capture the town. The commanding officer, Lieutenant-Colonel Stephen Mahon, took one squadron into the town while the other waited outside. A pitched battle then took place with heavy losses on both sides.

References

Battles of the Irish Rebellion of 1798
History of County Kildare